Buddy Schwimmer (born 1950) is a West Coast Swing dancer and choreographer, credited with inventing nightclub two-step in the 1960s.

Biography
On July 31, 2006, Schwimmer's  "5-6-7-8 Dance Studio" suffered a major fire while Schwimmer was in Los Angeles watching his son, Benji, compete on the program "So You Think You Can Dance". The studio, which holds both private lessons and classes with from 5 to 25 students, resumed full operations in September 2006.

Children
As of 2006, Schwimmer's son, Benji Schwimmer is an 8-time United States Showcase Champion of West Coast Swing.

Buddy also has a daughter, Lacey Schwimmer, who has won national dance championships and came in fourth in season three of So You Think You Can Dance. Lacey has danced for six seasons as one of the professionals on Dancing with the Stars.  Buddy appeared in the 13th season to help Lacey's partner Chaz Bono.

References

Bibliography
 "5-6-7-8 reopens, Benji considers offers", September 7, 2006, Redlandsdailyfacts.com
 San Bernardino Sun, September 15, 2006

External links
 Original Interview with Buddy Schwimmer Regarding this creation of Nightclub Two Step (1995)
 Instructor profile
 "So You Think You Can Dance" interviews, 2006

1950 births
American choreographers
American Latter Day Saints
American male dancers
living people
place of birth missing (living people)